Hildred Storey Geertz (February 12, 1927 – September 30, 2022) was an American anthropologist who has studied Balinese and Javanese kinship practices and Balinese art in Indonesia.

Between 1960 and 1970, Geertz served as a research scholar, a lecturer, and an assistant professor of social anthropology at the University of Chicago. Since 1970, she has been teaching in the Anthropology department at Princeton University. She was named professor emerita in 1998. Geertz was also the first female department chair at Princeton University. She received the honor for “People Who Have Made a Difference in the Lives of Women at Princeton” in 1998. She was also nominated as an outstanding anthropology educator by Marquis Who's Who in America.

Major works 
Geertz was born in New York City on February 12, 1927.  She completed her B.A. and met her future husband, Clifford Geertz in Antioch College, Ohio. Geertz conducted her first fieldwork in Java with fellowship for her graduate school studies from 1952 to 1954. She received her Ph.D. in Radcliffe College in 1956 and published The Javanese Family in 1961. The book examines the structures and functions of the Javanese kinship system. She provides detailed ethnographic data to show how the most central unit: the nuclear family, stabilizes and sustains Javanese society.

Geertz conducted fieldwork in Bali for a year in 1957. She continued her research of the kinship system. And she was co-author with her husband Clifford Geertz, of Kinship in Bali (Chicago,1975). This book refutes the popular view by the time: an emphasis on autonomous characteristics of kinship. It argues that the kinship system should be examined as a subsystem that inherits particular cultural patterns, ideas, and symbols of the society.

Geertz later worked in Sefrou, Morocco, with Lawrence Rosen and Clifford Geertz to understand Moroccan family structure and the formation of their social ties. She was co-author with them of Meaning and Order in Moroccan Society: Three Essays in Cultural Analysis.

Geertz published Images of Power: Balinese Paintings Made for Gregory Bateson and Margaret Mead (1994) after conducting work on a painting series about the village of Batuan, where Margaret Mead and Gregory Bateson studied in the 1930s and collected these paintings originally for further studies. She critically suggests that these paintings, painted by European artists who reside in Bali, reflect an “ethnography of Balinese imagination (p.1)” and are not insightful to show the Balinese characteristics.

Personal life and death 
Geertz married Clifford Geertz in 1948; they divorced in 1981. They had one son and one daughter. 

Geertz died in Princeton, New Jersey on September 30, 2022, at the age of 95.

Publications 
 Geertz, Hildred (1968). “Latah in Java: A theoretical paradox.” Indonesia Indonesia (Ithaca) No. 5. 
Geertz Hildred; Geertz, Clifford (1978). Kinship in Bali. Chicago: University of Chicago Press. .
Geertz, Hildred (1989). Javanese Family: A Study of Kinship and Socialization. Illinois: Waveland Press. .
Geertz, Hildred (1989). The Javanese family: a study of kinship and socialization American Council of Learned Societies. Illinois: Waveland Press. 
Geertz, Hildred (1991). State and Society in Bali: Historical Textual and Anthropological Approaches. Leiden: KITLV Press. 
 Geertz, Hildred (1994). Images of Power: Balinese Paintings Made for Gregory Bateson and Margaret Mead. Honolulu: University of Hawaii Press 
 Geertz, Hildred Geertz; Togog, Ida Bagus Made(2005). Tales From a Charmed Life: A Balinese Painter Reminisces. Honolulu: University of Hawaii Press. 
Geertz, Hildred (2014). Life of a Balinese Temple Artistry, Imagination, and History in a Peasant Village. Honolulu: University of Hawaii Press. 
 Geertz, Hildred (2017). Storytelling in Bali. Leiden: Boston Brill .

References 

1927 births
2022 deaths
Wikipedia Student Program
Antioch College alumni
Radcliffe College alumni
University of Chicago faculty
Princeton University faculty
American anthropologists
Women anthropologists
Social anthropologists
People from New York City